De Goldi is a surname. Notable people with the surname include:

Craig De Goldi (born 1975), New Zealand rugby football player
Kate De Goldi (born 1959), New Zealand writer